Pyrausta andrei is a moth in the family Crambidae. It was described by Eugene G. Munroe in 1976. It is found in North America, where it has been recorded from Texas.

References

Moths described in 1976
andrei
Moths of North America